Trip-a-Tron is a light synthesizer written by Jeff Minter and published through his Llamasoft company in 1988.  It was originally written for the Atari ST and later ported to the  Amiga in 1990 by Andy Fowler.

Description
Trip-A-Tron was released as shareware, but also came in a commercial package with a 3-ring-bound manual and 2 game disks.  The trial version contained no limitations, but registration was necessary to obtain the manual, which in turn was necessary to learn the script language ("KML" - supposedly "Keyboard Macro Language" and only coincidentally the phonetic equivalent of "camel") which drove the system.

The software has a usable but quirky user interface, filled with in-jokes and references to Llamasoft mascots.  For example, the button to exit from the MIDI editor is labelled "naff off", while the button to exit the file display is labelled with a sheep saying "Baa!"; the waveform editor colour cycles the words "Dead cool" above the waveform display, and the event sequencer displays an icon of a camel smoking a cigarette; and the image manipulation tool has a series of icons used to indicate how long the current operation is going to take: "Make the tea", "Have a fag", "Go to bed", "Go to sleep", "Go on holiday", "Go to Peru for six months", and "RIP"; and the scripting language command to set the length of drawn lines is "LLAMA".  (The manual states: "I could have called the command LINELENGTH I suppose, but I like llamas so what the heck".)

The manual is also written in a similar light, conversational style, but has been praised for nonetheless achieving a high degree of technical clarity.

In spite of this the software is extremely usable and was recommended as one of the best light synthesizers available at the time.

See also

Psychedelia (light synthesizer)
Virtual Light Machine
Neon (light synthesizer)

References

External links
 
 
 
 

1988 software
Atari ST software
Amiga software
Music visualization software
Llamasoft software